is a passenger railway station in the city of Sanmu, Chiba, Japan, operated by the East Japan Railway Company (JR East).

Lines
Hyūga Station is served by the Sōbu Main Line, and is located 71.7 km from the western terminus of the line at Tokyo Station.

Layout
The station consists of two opposed side platforms connected by a footbridge.The station is staffed.

Platforms

History
Hyūga Station was opened on October 12, 1899 as a station on the Sōbu Railway for both passenger and freight operations. On September 1, 1907, the Sōbu Railway was nationalised, becoming part of the Japanese Government Railway (JGR). After World War II, the JGR became the Japan National Railways (JNR). Scheduled freight operations were suspended from October 1, 1962. A new station building was completed in July 1984. The station was absorbed into the JR East network upon the privatization of the Japan National Railways (JNR) on April 1, 1987. The station was unattended from March 15, 1974 until July 1, 1997.

Passenger statistics
In fiscal 2019, the station was used by an average of 873 passengers daily (boarding passengers only).

Surrounding area
The station is located in the urban center of the former town of Sanmu.
 Sanmu Middle School
Sanmu Elementary School

See also
 List of railway stations in Japan

References

External links

  JR East station information 

Railway stations in Japan opened in 1899
Railway stations in Chiba Prefecture
Sōbu Main Line
Sanmu